Belmont is an unincorporated community in Jefferson County, in the U.S. state of Tennessee.

Belmont is derived from French, meaning "beautiful mountain.

References

Unincorporated communities in Jefferson County, Tennessee
Unincorporated communities in Tennessee